Roman Gladiator is an outdoor 1881 bronze sculpture by Gustave Georges (Joris) Theodore Geefs (20 November 1850 – 4 December 1933), the son of Joseph Geefs who is a brother of Guillaume Geefs, installed in San Francisco's Golden Gate Park, in the U.S. state of California.

Description
The statue depicts a nude man holding a sword, and wearing a cloak and helmet. It measures approximately 100 x 36.25 x 33 inches, and rests on a base that measures approximately 40 x 44 x 44 inches. The bronze plaque on the front of the base reads:

History
The sculpture was surveyed by the Smithsonian Institution's "Save Outdoor Sculpture!" program in 1992, and is administered by the San Francisco Arts Commission.

See also

 1881 in art

References

External links
 
 National Identity and Nineteenth-Century Franco-Belgian Sculpture, note 39 by Jana Wijnsouw, 2018

1881 establishments in California
1881 sculptures
Bronze sculptures in California
Golden Gate Park
Monuments and memorials in California
Nude sculptures in California
Outdoor sculptures in San Francisco
Sculptures of men in California
Statues in San Francisco